William Barclay Parsons (April 15, 1859 – May 9, 1932) was an American civil engineer. He founded Parsons Brinckerhoff, one of the largest American civil engineering firms.

Personal life
Parsons was the son of William Barclay Parsons (1828–1887) and Eliza Glass Livingston Parsons (1831–1922).  His siblings included Schuyler (1852–1917), Harry (1862–1935), and George (1863–1939). His maternal grandparents were Ann Eliza (née Hosie) Livingston (1805–1838) and Schuyler Livingston (1804–1861), a descendant of Walter Livingston who ran a line of clipper ships from the New York harbor named Barclay & Livingston.  His paternal grandparents were William Burrington Parsons (1794–1869) and Anne Barclay Parsons (1788–1869). He was the great-grandson of Henry Barclay, second Rector of Trinity Church in Manhattan.

In 1871, he went to school in Torquay, England, and studied under private tutors for four years while traveling in France, Germany, and Italy.  He received a bachelor's degree from Columbia College of Columbia University in 1879, and a second from the Columbia School of Mines in 1882.  He served as class president and president of the Philolexian Society, and he co-founded the Columbia Daily Spectator in 1877. He later served as chairman of the university's board of trustees.

Parsons married Anna Dewitt Reed (1858–1958) on May 20, 1884. (She was the daughter of Rev. Sylvanus Reed (1821–1870) and Caroline Gallup Reed (1821–1914). Her brother Sylvanus was the aerospace engineer who developed the modern metal aircraft propeller.) Their children were Sylvia (1885–1962), who married Rudolph Weld (1883–1941) in 1908, and William (1888–1973), who married Rose Peabody (1891–1985), daughter of Endicott Peabody (1857–1944).

Parsons died on May 9, 1932, in New York City.

Career
Parsons worked for the New York, Lake Erie and Western Railroad from 1882 through 1885. He wrote Turnouts; Exact Formulae for Their Determination (1884) and Track, A Complete Manual of Maintenance of Way (1886) which both addressed railroad problems, and this interest in rail transportation continued throughout his life.

Parsons designed the Cape Cod Canal as Chief Engineer.  He was also Chief Engineer of the Board of Rapid Transit Railroad Commissioners and was responsible for the construction of the Interborough Rapid Transit (IRT) subway line. He left New York in October 1886 to serve as Chief Engineer for the Fort Worth and Rio Grande Railroad, although he retained his affiliation with the District Railway Company. In 1887, he became the Chief Engineer and General Manager of the Denver Railroad and Land and Coal Company. He returned to New York in 1891 upon the completion of these railway projects and a number of water-work ventures in Mississippi.

Parsons was appointed to the Isthmian Canal Commission in 1904 by President Theodore Roosevelt. He was also appointed to the Advisory Board which provided technical advice to the Royal Commission on London Traffic in 1904, along with Sir Benjamin Baker and Sir John Wolfe-Barry, both British civil engineers. In early 1905, he traveled to Panama as a member of the committee of engineers which favored a sea-level canal.

 Parsons was the Colonel of the 11th Engineers of the American Expeditionary Force (AEF) in France during World War I. He was with a team of engineers in Battle of Cambrai that was suddenly attacked by Germans while making railroad repairs; the engineers fought back with picks and shovels. He was cited for "specially meritorious services" and received decorations from the United States, Great Britain, France, Belgium, and the state of New York.

Publications
An American Engineer in China (1900)
"The American Engineers in France. 1920.
Engineers and Engineering of the Renaissance (1939)
Robert Fulton and the Submarine. 1922.
Track, a complete manual of maintenance of way. 1886.
Turnouts: exact formulae for their determination, together with practical and accurate tables for use in the field. (1884). .

References

External links

William Barclay Parsons and the NYC Subway, New York Public Library
William Barclay Parsons, Columbia College
William Barclay Parsons, Flickr Commons

1859 births
1932 deaths
Livingston family
Schuyler family
American civil engineers
Columbia School of Mines alumni
History of the New York City Subway
Columbia College (New York) alumni